Marty Gordon Howe (born February 18, 1954) is a Canadian-American former professional ice hockey defenseman. Howe was drafted in the third round, 51st overall in the 1974 NHL Entry Draft by the Montreal Canadiens. From 2001 to 2006, he was an assistant coach for the Chicago Wolves of the AHL. He is the son of Colleen and Gordie Howe, older brother of Mark Howe, and nephew of Vic Howe.

Playing career
As a youth, Howe played in the 1965 and 1966 Quebec International Pee-Wee Hockey Tournaments along with his brother Mark, on the Detroit Roostertail minor ice hockey team. He started his junior career with the Toronto Marlboros of the OHA (now the OHL). In 1973, he chose to join his father Gordie and brother Mark to play with the Houston Aeros of the World Hockey Association (WHA). Even though he was drafted by the Canadiens in 1974, he did not play in the National Hockey League (NHL) until 1979, when the WHA joined the NHL.

Career statistics

Regular season and playoffs

International

Awards and accomplishments
SOJHL All-Star Second Team: 1970–71 (Detroit)
Played in 1976 WHA All-Star Game
In 2000, the Howe family received the Wayne Gretzky International Award, for major contributions to the growth and advancement of hockey in the United States.
In 2010, he was inducted into the World Hockey Association Hall of Fame as a member of "The Howe Family" (including Gordie, Mark, Marty, and Colleen Howe).

International play
Although Marty Howe was born and raised in Detroit, Michigan he never represented the United States in international hockey. Having dual citizenship, his only international appearance was as a member of Team Canada during the 1974 Summit Series versus the Soviet Union.

See also
Notable families in the NHL

References

External links

Marty Howe's profile @ Hockeydraftcentral.com

1954 births
American men's ice hockey defensemen
American people of Canadian descent
American people of English descent
Binghamton Whalers players
Boston Bruins players
Flint Bulldogs players
Hartford Whalers announcers
Hartford Whalers players
Houston Aeros (WHA) players
Ice hockey people from Michigan
Living people
Montreal Canadiens draft picks
New England Whalers players
Sportspeople from Detroit
Springfield Indians players
Toronto Marlboros players
Ice hockey coaches from Michigan
Ice hockey people from Detroit